In combinatorics, a laminar set family is a set family in which each pair of sets are either disjoint or related by containment. Formally, a set family {S1, S2, ...} is called laminar if for every i, j, the intersection of Si and Sj is either empty, or equals Si, or equals Sj.

Let E be a ground-set of elements. A laminar set-family on E can be constructed by recursively partitioning E into parts and sub-parts. In particular, the singleton family {E} is laminar; if we partition E into some k pairwise-disjoint parts E1,...,Ek, then {E, E1,...,Ek} is laminar too; if we now partition e.g. E1 into E11, E12, ... E1j, then adding these sub-parts yields another laminar family; etc. Hence, a laminar set-family can be seen as a partitioning of the ground-set into categories and sub-categories.

References 

Families of sets